Odescalchi is a surname of Italian origin. It may refer to:

 Erba-Odescalchi, Italian noble family of princely rank
 Castello Orsini-Odescalchi, in Bracciano, in the Province of Rome, Lazio, Italy

 Benedetto Odescalchi (1611-1689), the future pope Innocent XI

 Benedetto II Erba Odescalchi (1679–1740), Italian Cardinal and Roman Catholic Archbishop of Milan 
 Carlo Odescalchi (1785–1841), Italian prince and priest, archbishop of Ferrara, cardinal 
 Livio Odescalchi (17th century), Italian nobleman, Duke of Bracciano, Ceri and Sirmium
 Ladislao Odescalchi (1920–2000), Italian sports shooter
 Paolo Odescalchi (died 1585), Italian Roman Catholic Bishop of Penne e Atri (1568–1572), and Apostolic Nuncio to Naples 
 Giulio Maria Odescalchi (1612–1666), Italian Roman Catholic Bishop of Novara